Arjun Chandy is an Indo-american singer, arranger, studio vocalist and vocal group coach from Dallas, Texas.

Career 
Chandy is from a family of artists. His infant years were spent heavily immersed in Indian classical music.  He completed his vocal arangetram in Dallas and was accompanied by Shri Poovalur Sriji on the Mridangam and Shri Ramana Indrakumar on the Ghatam.  During his school days, he learned to read music and studied music theory, joining the school choir. This helped to understand western classical music. When he was 14, he started singing for a quartet in middle school. 

At the age of 15, after getting involved in the world of jazz, he started working professionally, conducting and arranging music for groups in United States. Later, he became a part of The Vocal Majority in the U.S. Chandy contributed to the formation of "NAFS- The Band" when A. R. Rahman called him to Chennai at the end of 2013. Chandy is presently the band's director and conductor. He spent a year post 2013 to train the band. 

In an interview with Seychelles News Agency, Chandy said: "Rahman always wanted to put together a vocal band of sorts, because he loves vocal groups and harmonies, not necessarily a capella but just the sound of a group singing, even if it's a large choir, if there's vocal harmony, he's a big fan of jazz and all these things."

References

Indian male playback singers
Year of birth missing (living people)
Singers from Chennai
Living people